Bajadero is a community in the municipality of Arecibo, Puerto Rico. Its population in 2010 was 3,710. Three barrios border each other and each contains a section of the community. The Bajadero community in the barrio of Arenalejos had a population of 2,380 in 2010. The Bajadero community in the barrio of Carreras had a population of 64 in 2010 and the Bajadero community in the barrio of Domingo Ruíz had a population of 1,266 in 2010. There is a U.S. Post office in the community of Bajadero and its zip code is 00616.

See also

List of communities in Puerto Rico
List of barrios and sectors of Arecibo, Puerto Rico

References

Arecibo, Puerto Rico